Laaj (lit:Respect) is a Pakistani romantic television series that was aired on 23 July 2016. Created by Momina Duraid, series starrs Iqra Aziz, Kamran Jilani and Zarnish Khan.

Plot 
This is a story of arrogance. Bari Sahab is a widowed, head of a house. Her husband's brother, Sikandar is jealous and is against of her. Sikandar has a son, Dilawar, who is married and has a son, Sajjad. Bari Sahab has two sons, Jahanzaib Chaudhry and Shahzeb. Bari Sahab was also eldest among her only sister, who died when her daughter Zainab was young. She later used to live in Bari Sahab's home. She loved Jahanzaib more than anything. But Jahanzaib was married to Meena whom Zainab hated, and because of her curse she did for Meena that she die, Meena died after giving a daughter, Mannat. Mannat and Sajjad were married initially but are at end of their marriage. Mannat and Shahmir are secretly in love and want to marry but because of Shahmir's evil plans that she was forced to marry Sajjad makes Mannat to hate Shahmir but he often visits Sain Sarkar's Mazar with Mannat. Mannat's sorrows began from her real mom Meena's death. Jahanzeb says Zainab to care of Mannat and she does. Sajjad later divorces Mannat on Bari Sahab's wish as she always wanted that Mannat shouldn't marry Sajjad. Shahzeb acts as he loves Zainab but he is in love with Alisha. Mannat and Shahmir run away from home to save Mannats unborn child. Zainab assists them in running away. When the morning comes people in the haveli find out that mannat and shahmir ran away and then jahanzaib sends people to find mannat and shamir. Mannat and Shahmir seek shelter in the city in Alisha’s house. Alisha calls the media to raise awareness of what happened to Mannat and to help other girls who may be going through a similar situation. Through the news, they found out that zainab helped them run away. Due to this shock Bari sahab faints and is in a coma. Shahzeb is on his way to Alisha’s house to collect mannat, however he gets shot and killed by one of Sikander’s men. In the end mannat gives birth to a baby boy. Alisha starts a school in which 300 students attend. The drama ends with Jahanzaib playing with his grandson; swinging the baby in the air.

Cast

Main 
 Zarnish Khan as Zainab
Iqra Aziz as Mannat Chaudhry
 Kamran Jilani as Chaudhry Jahanzaib

Supporting 
 Asma Abbas as Bari Sahab
 Nayyar Ejaz as Sikandar
 Saleem Sheikh as Dilawar Sikandar
 Hafiz Mohsin Ali as Shahmir
 Shamayal Tareen as Meena (Dead)
 Sabeeka Imam as Alisha
 Mirza Zain Baig as Shahzeb
 Haajraa
 Imran Ahmad as Sajjad (Dead)
 Muhammad Ashraf Rahi as Sikandar's servant & helper

Original soundtrack 

The soundtrack of Laaj was produced in the label of MD Productions and written by Edison Idrees Masih, fiction writer. Its lyrics are written by Sabir Zafar, lyricist.

Production 

In an interview (of the cast of Laaj on 22 July 2016) conducted by Sanam Jung, host of the morning show Jago Pakistan Jago, the director, Fahim Burney said that the project was first introduced 8 years ago but due to facilities not being available, the project was delayed. The drama serial deals with various themes, such as honour killing, importance of education for women and early (forced) marriage. Kamran Jeelani in the interview revealed that the experience shooting for Laaj was fun as there was a good director and cast, however the shoot was tough due to Ramazan and weather of Lahore and the cast had to wear heavy clothing as per requirements of the script. The travelling also made the shoot tough as the cast had to travel from Lahore to Muridke and back, daily, which would take 2–3 hours.

See also 
 List of programs broadcast by Hum TV
 2016 in Pakistani television

References

External links 
 Official website

Pakistani drama television series
2016 Pakistani television series debuts
2016 Pakistani television series endings
Television series set in Punjab, Pakistan
Urdu-language television shows
Hum TV original programming